Bagh Baghu (also Romanized as Bagh Baghū, Baghbaghū, Bāgh Baqu, and Baqbaqū) is a village in Marzdaran Rural District, Marzdaran District, Sarakhs County, Razavi Khorasan Province, Iran. At the 2006 census, its population was 314, in 68 families.

See also 

 List of cities, towns and villages in Razavi Khorasan Province

References 

Populated places in Sarakhs County